Brigadier Ivan Simson,  (14 August 1890 – 4 February 1971) was a British Army officer and the Chief Engineer in Malaya from August 1941 until its surrender to the Japanese in 1942. Simson was tasked with improving the defenses in Singapore in the face of possible attack by the Japanese, although Simson's defensive recommendations were largely rejected by his commander, Lieutenant General Arthur Percival, as being bad for morale. Previously he was Deputy Chief Engineer Scottish Command.

The Battle of Singapore from 8 to 15 February resulted in a decisive Japanese victory and the capture of Percival, Simson, and the majority of troops under them.

References

Sources
Murfett, Malcolm H., John Miksic, Brian Farell, and Chiang Ming Shun. Between 2 Oceans (2nd Edn): A Military History of Singapore from 1275 to 1971. Marshall Cavendish International Asia Pte Ltd, 2011.
Generals of World War II

1890 births
1971 deaths
British Army brigadiers of World War II
Royal Engineers officers
Officers of the Order of the British Empire
British people in British Malaya